Under Blazing Skies or Under Blazing Heavens (German: Unter heißem Himmel) is a 1936 German adventure film directed by Gustav Ucicky and starring Hans Albers, Lotte Lang and Aribert Wäscher.  It was shot at the Babelsberg Studios in Berlin and on location on the Aegean Sea coast of Greece. The film's sets were designed by the art directors Robert Herlth and Walter Röhrig. It was produced and distributed by Germany's largest film company UFA. The film was popular enough to be given a second release in West Germany in 1950.

Cast

References

Bibliography 
 Kreimeier, Klaus. The Ufa Story: A History of Germany's Greatest Film Company, 1918-1945. University of California Press, 1999.

External links 
 

1936 films
German adventure films
1936 adventure films
1930s German-language films
Films directed by Gustav Ucicky
UFA GmbH films
Seafaring films
Films of Nazi Germany
Films shot in Greece
Films set in the Mediterranean Sea
German black-and-white films
1930s German films
Films shot at Babelsberg Studios